The Black Rhyme Organisation to Help Equal Rights (B.R.O.T.H.E.R. ) was a 1989 protest supergroup founded in the United Kingdom by the raga-rap group Gatecrash and a collective of Hip hop musicians to protest the policies of apartheid in South Africa.

The group's debut single, Beyond the 16th Parallel, was released on Island Records "4th & Broadway" label. It was followed by a music video. The artists involved donated all royalties to the African National Congress.

The second B.R.O.T.H.E.R. project was a three-track EP, Ghettogeddon, focusing on the issue of inner city gun culture in the early 1990s. The artists involved donated all royalties to SCAR, Sickle Cell Anemia Research.

Participants

Adisa
Cookie Crew
Crucial Robbie
The Demon Boyz
Jerry Dammers
Five Black Intellects
Freshki
Gatecrash
Gunshot
Bernie Grant
Hijack
Icepick
Junior San
Katch 22
Junior Reid
The London Posse
London Rhyme Syndicate
MC Mell'O'
Mr Banton
Overlord X
Ricky Rankin
Rebel MC
Andrew Sloley
She Rockers
Son of Noise
Standing Ovation
Sweetie Ire
Tenna Fly
Tippa Irie
Trouble & Bass

See also
Artists United Against Apartheid

External links
"B.R.O.T.H.E.R." at Discog

Hip hop collectives